Raja ki Mandi railway station is on the Agra–Delhi chord.  It is located in Agra district in the Indian state of Uttar Pradesh. It serves Raja ki Mandi and surrounding neighbourhoods in Agra.

Overview
Agra, the 16-17th century capital of the Mughals, is home to monuments such as the Taj Mahal and the Agra Fort. The Taj Mahal attracts 7-8 million tourists annually. About 0.8  million foreign tourists visit it. There is a very old temple of Goddess Chamunda, one of the forms of Maa Durga or Goddess Kali, on platform No. 1  and thousands of followers and passengers visit this temple every day, but on Saturday this number goes from thousand to lakhs.

History
The broad-gauge Agra–Delhi chord was opened in 1904. The construction of this station begin in 1904. Earlier the station was located in the Raja ki Mandi main Bazar. In 1910 the station was relocated outside the main market of Raja ki mandi area

Electrification
The Faridabad–Mathura–Agra section was electrified in 1982–85, Tundla–Yamuna Bridge in 1998–99 and Yamuna Bridge–Agra in 1990–91.

Passengers
Raja ki Mandi railway station serves around 114,000 passengers every day.

Amenities
Raja ki Mandi railway station has retiring room and a book stall.

Gallery

References

External links
 Trains at Raja ki Mandi

Railway stations in Agra
Agra railway division